Frederick Mills may refer to:

Sir Frederick Mills, 1st Baronet (1865–1953), English iron and steel manufacturer and politician
Frederick Mills (engineer) (1898–1949), Chief Mechanical Engineer of the Western Australian Government Railways
Frederick Mills (cricketer) (1898–1929), English cricketer
Frederick Mills (rugby union) (1849–1904), English rugby union player
Frederick C. Mills (1892–1964), American economist
Fred Mills (footballer) (1910–1944), English footballer
Freddie Mills (1919–1965), English boxer
Fred Mills (musician) (1935–2009), Canadian trumpeter
Fred Mills (politician) (born 1955), Louisiana politician